Acrocercops thrylodes is a moth of the family Gracillariidae. It is known from India (Maharashtra).

The larvae feed on Carissa carandas. They probably mine the leaves of their host plant.

References

thrylodes
Moths described in 1930
Moths of Asia